Georgios Zaravinas (born 13 June 1976) is a Greek former handball player and current coach. He competed in the men's tournament at the 2004 Summer Olympics.

References

External links
 

1976 births
Living people
Greek male handball players
Olympic handball players of Greece
Handball players at the 2004 Summer Olympics
Sportspeople from Ioannina